Danilo II was the Archbishop of Serbs 1324 to 1337, under the rule of Kings Stephen Uroš III (1321–1331) and Dušan the Mighty (1331–1355, crowned Emperor in 1345). As a Serbian monk, he was also a chronicler, active in court and Church politics, holding the office during the zenith of the Nemanjić dynasty-era; he wrote many biographies which are considered part of the most notable medieval Serbian literature.

Life and work

Born around 1270 in the župa of Pilot (present-day Pult, in northern Albania), his given name has not been recorded, only that he belonged to a Serbian noble family. He was endowed with a fine intellect and a noble disposition; he had received an excellent education at the hands of the most learned men in Medieval Serbia and in Byzantium. After his education, he joined the court of the Serbian king Stefan Milutin, which he left around 1300 to join the monastery of Končul on the Ibar river. After his novitiate, he went to Peć at the request of the Serbian archbishop Jevstatije, where he was made a presbyter priest. After that, he progressed quickly in the ecclesiastical hierarchy of the Serbian Orthodox Church: first as abbot of Hilandar, then as bishop of Banjska (1312-1315), and finally as archbishop from 1324 until his death in 1337. He died on 19 December 1337 and was buried in one of the churches he had built in the monastery of Peć, Our Lady Hodegetria.

Danilo wrote biographies of Serbian medieval kings and archbishops, including the biography of Jelena, the wife of King Stephen Uroš I of Serbia (1243–1276). His monumental work is referred to in the poetry of Serbian folklore as knjige starostavne (the ancient books) and knjige carostavne (the royal books). As a result of his work, many historical details concerning both the rulers of medieval Serbia and the members of the Nemanjić dynasty have been preserved.

Legacy

He is included in The 100 most prominent Serbs.

See also
 Jefimija
 Princess Milica of Serbia
 Stefan Lazarević
 Teodosije
 Domentijan
 Stefan Dušan
 Teodosije the Hilandarian (1246-1328), one of the most important Serbian writers in the Middle Ages
 Miroslav Gospel
 Gabriel the Hilandarian
 Danilo's anonymous pupil

References

 Translated and adapted from Serbian: https://www.rastko.rs/kosovo/pecarsija/ljudi/vl_sava-danilo_II_l.html

Sources

Further reading

Serbian saints of the Eastern Orthodox Church
Eastern Orthodox Christians from Serbia
Year of birth missing
Year of death missing
14th-century Christian saints
14th-century Eastern Orthodox bishops
14th-century Serbian people
Archbishops of Serbs
Burials at the Patriarchate of Peć (monastery)